Jigarthanda may refer to:

Jigarthanda (2014 film), a Tamil film
Jigarthanda (2016 film), a Kannada film
Jigarthanda (drink), an Indian beverage